WXTS-FM (88.3 FM) is a jazz radio station licensed to Toledo, Ohio. WXTS broadcasts on 88.3 from 8 am to 8 pm, with WXUT broadcasting on the frequency from 8 pm to 8 am. The station is currently owned by Toledo Public Schools.

See also
WXUT (shares frequency with WXTS-FM)

References

External links
WXTS - Toledo's Only Real Jazz

XTS-FM